The sentence of life imprisonment under Norwegian law is restricted to the military penal code (e.g. for aiding the enemy during a time of war). In the civilian penal code, a law passed in 2002 allows for an indeterminate penalty that could, in theory, result in life imprisonment. The first Norwegian prisoner ever sentenced to the 21 years' preventive detention was Viggo Kristiansen, who was convicted of murder and rape, but exonerated in 2022.

Maximum penalty under Norwegian law
There are three types of maximum penalty laws:

 The maximum penalty under the military penal code is life imprisonment.
 The maximum determinate penalty (civilian penal code) is 21 years' imprisonment, but only a small percentage of prisoners serve more than 14 years. Prisoners will typically get unsupervised parole for weekends after serving a third of their sentence (a maximum of 7 years) and can receive early release after serving two thirds of their sentence (a maximum of 14 years). In 2008, to fulfill its requirements under the Rome Statute, Norway created a new maximal penalty of 30 years for crimes against humanity.
 The indeterminate penalty (civilian penal code), called "preventive detention" (Norwegian: forvaring), is set at up to 21 years' imprisonment, with no eligibility for parole for a time period of 14 years. If the prisoner is still considered dangerous after serving the original sentence, the detention can be extended by five years at a time. Renewal of the detention every five years can in theory result in actual life imprisonment. Preventive detention is used when the prisoner is deemed a danger to society and there is a great chance of them committing violent crimes in the future. However, after the minimum time period has elapsed, the offender can petition for parole once every year, and this may be granted if it is determined that they are no longer a danger to society.

List of people sentenced to preventive detention in Norway 
This is a partial list of people sentenced to Preventive detention in Norway since its introduction in 2001.

As of 2011, there are 76 offenders that are serving a sentence of preventive detention.

References

External links 
 Ila prison Preventive Detention - Factsheet

Norway
Law of Norway

no:Forvaring